The 1913 Missouri Tigers football team was an American football team that represented the University of Missouri in the Missouri Valley Conference (MVC) during the 1913 college football season. The team compiled a 7–1 record (4–0 against MVC opponents), was a co-champion of the conference, and outscored all opponents by a combined total of 193 to 67. Chester Brewer was the head coach for the third of three seasons. The team played its home games at Rollins Field in Columbia, Missouri.

Schedule

References

Missouri
Missouri Tigers football seasons
Missouri Valley Conference football champion seasons
Missouri Tigers football